Senator Reed may refer to:

Members of the United States State Senate 
Philip Reed (politician) (1760–1829), Democratic-Republican Senator from Maryland from 1806 to 1813 
Thomas Buck Reed (1787–1829), Jacksonian Senator from Mississippi from 1826 to 1827 and again in 1829
James A. Reed (politician) (1861–1944), Democratic Senator from Missouri from 1911 to 1929
Clyde M. Reed (1871–1949), Republican Senator from Kansas from 1939 to 1949
David A. Reed (1880–1953), Republican Senator from Pennsylvania from 1922 to 1935
Jack Reed (Rhode Island politician) (born 1949), Democratic Senator from Rhode Island since 1997

Members of state senates in the United States 
Levi Reed (1814–1869), member of the Massachusetts State Senate from 1860 to 1861
Joseph Rea Reed (1835–1925), member of the Iowa State Senate in 1866 and 1868
Thomas Brackett Reed (1839–1902), Republican member of the Maine State Senate in 1870
John H. Reed (1921–2012), Republican member of the Maine State Senate in the 1950s
Greg Reed (born 1965), Republican member of the Alabama State Senate since 2010
Kasim Reed (born 1969), Democratic member of the Georgia State Senate from 2003 to 2009
Carlton Day Reed Jr. (1930–2012), Maine State Senate
Charles A. Reed (New Jersey politician) (1857–1940), New Jersey State Senate
Chester I. Reed (1823–1873), Massachusetts State Senate
Duncan Reed (1815–1890), Wisconsin State Senate
George B. Reed (1807–1883), Wisconsin State Senate
Isaac Reed (politician) (1809–1887), Maine State Senate
Levi Reed (1814–1869), Massachusetts State Senate
Milton Reed (1848–1932), Massachusetts State Senate
Myron Reed (1836–), Wisconsin State Senate
Perry A. C. Reed (1871–1943), Nebraska State Senate
Stuart F. Reed (1866–1935), West Virginia State Senate
William W. Reed (1825–1916), Wisconsin State Senate

See also
Senator Read (disambiguation)
Senator Reid (disambiguation)
Eugene Elliott Reed (1866–1940), Democratic candidate in the 1918 State Senate election in New Hampshire
Christopher Reed (politician) (born 1972), Republican candidate in the 2008 State Senate election in Iowa